Rumeshkhan-e Sharqi Rural District was a former rural district (dehestan) in Rumeshkhan District, Kuhdasht County, Lorestan Province, Iran. At the 2006 census, its population was 19,418, in 4,055 families.  The rural district had 16 villages.

In 2013 Rumeshkhan County was created from Rumshkhan District, and new districts and new rural districts were created.

References 

Rural Districts of Lorestan Province
Kuhdasht County